NGC 850 is a lenticular galaxy in the constellation Cetus. It is estimated to be 300 million light-years from the Milky Way and has a diameter of approximately 130,000 ly.

See also 
 List of NGC objects (1–1000)

References

External links 
 

Lenticular galaxies
0850
Cetus (constellation)
008369